Events in the year 1999 in Ukraine.

Incumbents 

 President: Leonid Kuchma
 Prime Minister: Valeriy Pustovoitenko (until 22 December), Viktor Yushchenko (from 22 December)

Events 

 31 October – The first round of presidential elections were held in the country, with a second round held on 14 November. The result was a victory for Leonid Kuchma, who defeated Petro Symonenko in the run-off.

Deaths

References 

 
Ukraine
Ukraine
1990s in Ukraine
Years of the 20th century in Ukraine